George Sanford may refer to:

 George Sanford (American football) (1870–1938), American football player and coach, College Football Hall of Fame inductee
 George Sanford (assemblyman), member of the 64th New York State Legislature
 George Sanford (political scientist), British academic specializing in Polish and East European Studies
 George H. Sanford (1836–1871), New York politician